Polygala chinensis is a species of flowering plant in the family Polygalaceae. It is native to tropical Asia, China and Australia.

References

chinensis
Flora of China
Flora of tropical Asia
Flora of Australia